Donna Jay Fulks is an American actress who specializes in voice acting. She has voiced several characters including Longclaw the Owl in Sonic the Hedgehog, 2020 and reprised the role in its sequel released in 2022 and Mayor Muckford in the animation Sharkdog (2021).

Personal life
Donna is married to singer-songwriter, Robbie Fulks. Together, they have three children.

Education
Fulks attended New York University as a theater major. A few years later, she finished her degree at Columbia College Chicago.

After graduation, she found an agent and auditioned for plays, film, and TV. Out of the blue, when a call for a voiceover part came in, her agent sent her on an audition.

Filmography

Film

Television

References

External links
 

Living people
American film actresses
American television actresses
American video game actresses
American voice actresses
Year of birth missing (living people)
21st-century American women